"Coming On Strong" is a song written by Little David Wilkins and performed by Brenda Lee.  The song reached #11 on the Billboard Hot 100 in 1966.  The song also reached #9 in Canada and #76 in Australia. It was featured on her 1966 album, Coming on Strong.

Lee's version is referenced in the 1973 Golden Earring song "Radar Love".

The song was ranked #70 on Billboard magazine's Top Hot 100 songs of 1966.

Other versions
Don Bryant released a version of the song as a single in 1966.
Barbara Mandrell released a version on her 1980 album, Love Is Fair.
Toody Cole as the A-Side of a single in 1985

References

1966 songs
1966 singles
Brenda Lee songs
Barbara Mandrell songs
Decca Records singles
Hi Records singles
Songs written by Little David Wilkins